Santa Cruz de Cocachacra District is one of thirty-two districts of the Huarochirí Province, located in the Department of Lima in Peru. The district was created by the Law No. 13261 in October 29, 1959, during the second presidency of Manuel Prado Ugarteche.

References